The 1960 FA Cup final was the 79th final of the world's oldest domestic football cup competition, the FA Cup. It took place on 7 May 1960 at Wembley Stadium in London. The match was contested by Blackburn Rovers and Wolverhampton Wanderers.

Wolves won the game and the cup after a 3–0 victory, with a Norman Deeley double after Blackburn defender Mick McGrath had scored an own goal. This was Wolves' fourth and most recent FA Cup success.

This was the first time the FA Cup winners would be given a berth for European competition, into the newly formed Cup Winners' Cup.

Road to Wembley

Blackburn Rovers

Wolverhampton Wanderers

Background
Wolverhampton Wanderers were clear favourites going into the match, having won the league title in the previous two seasons and only being denied a third successive championship during this season, after being pipped by just a single point by Burnley. Blackburn Rovers, on the other hand, had not had a great season, finishing in 17th place in only their second season back in top flight football. Both league games between the two during the season had been won by Wolves (3–1 and 1–0).

If current form favoured Wolves, Blackburn had the better FA Cup pedigree historically, with six triumphs already to their name, compared to Wolves' three. They had already displayed their cup strength by eliminating three of the top four clubs that season en route to the final – Burnley, Tottenham Hotspur and Sheffield Wednesday.

Match

Summary

First half
The match was one of the warmest cup finals recorded, with many spectators having to be treated for fainting, leading to the game being played at a very sedate pace throughout. The opening 15 minutes set the tone for the contest in both pace and with both teams ruthlessly applying the offside trap to nullify their opponent (leading the TV commentator to eventually dub it 'The Offside Final').

As the half progressed Wolves began to gain control and seemed most likely to open the scoring, with Jimmy Murray mis-hitting with the goal before him. Despite this it was Blackburn who eventually had the most dangerous shot on target when Peter Dobing jinked through Wolves defence to fire at goal, but goalkeeper Malcolm Finlayson was able to block the shot.

Failing to take that opportunity soon proved costly for Blackburn when they suffered a disastrous few minutes. A low cross driven in by Stobart was deflected past Blackburn's goalkeeper by his own unfortunate defender, Mick McGrath to break the deadlock on 41 minutes. Then, two minutes later Blackburn's woes heightened as full-back Dave Whelan fractured his leg in a challenge with Norman Deeley. Though initially overlooked by the referee who allowed play to continue, both men needed substantial treatment. Whelan was eventually stretchered off, and, without the use of substitutes, left his team to complete the game with only 10 men.

Second half
When the team re-emerged after the interval, Deeley was still labouring and showing signs of discomfort from his clash with Whelan. The continued use of the offside trap, crude and poorly organised by modern standards but largely effective, saved Blackburn falling further behind in the 50th minute when Murray slotted home after Blackburn goalkeeper Harry Leyland fumbled a low Des Horne cross only for Barry Stobart – in modern terms not interfering with play – to be flagged.

Murray came close to getting himself a legitimate goal on 68 minutes when he was left free on the edge of the penalty area, only for Leyland to block his swivelling shot with his legs. From the resulting corner Wolves worked the ball for Horne to pass across the face of the goal, finding Deeley at the far post who drove the ball in to all but seal victory. Wolves then had the ball in the net for fourth time seven minutes later when Ron Flowers tapped-in which was again flagged offside.

Blackburn offered little resistance and failed to create any goalscoring opportunities throughout the second half leaving Wolves to complete the scoring two minutes from time when the Blackburn defence was hesitant in clearing the ball, allowing Deeley to shoot high into the top corner from five yards.

Bill Slater then led the Wolves players up the famous Wembley steps to be presented with the trophy by The Duchess of Gloucester, and the Cup was heading back to Molineux for a fourth time (as of 2020) and last time.

Ron Flowers, the last surviving member of the victorious Wolves team, died in November 2021. Dave Whelan, Mick McGrath, Louis Bimpson, Peter Dobing and Bryan Douglas are the surviving players from the Blackburn Rovers team.

Details

Coverage 
The game was broadcast live on television on the BBC Grandstand programme (12:45pm to 5pm) with commentary by Kenneth Wolstenholme. Only four cameras used for the entire broadcast while use of on-screen score captions, which had been adopted for the first time the previous year was dropped. Wolstenholme described the game early on as 'The White Shirt Final' due to the breathless heat within Wembley Stadium, which led the vast majority of spectators to remove their jackets. As it was still the custom to attend the cup final in 'Sunday best' this led to an arena dominated by white shirted spectators.

The press dubbed the game 'The Dustbin Final' due in part to the feeling that the game had been "rubbish" but also for the bad reaction by Blackburn fans to the victorious Wolves team as they paraded the cup being pelted with match programmes, paper cups and other rubbish accumulated in the stands during the game.

As well as television the game was also broadcast live on BBC Radio while black and white newsreel footage from both Pathé and Movietone was screened in cinemas that evening.

FA Cup Finals
FA Cup Final
FA Cup Final 1960
FA Cup Final 1960
FA Cup Final
FA Cup Final